Alexandre Beaume, called Alexandre Beaumont (1 August 1827 – 11 March 1909), was a French librettist, playwright and novelist.

After he finished his studies in law he set up a law practice. He is mostly known for his literary production (novels, theatre plays and opera libretti) under the pseudonym "Alexandre Beaumont". With the help of Charles Nuitter, he translated into French the libretto by Francesco Maria Piave and Andrea Maffei for the presentation of Macbeth by Giuseppe Verdi at the Théâtre-Lyrique in Paris in 1865.

References

External links 
 Alexandre Beaumont on Data.bnf.fr

19th-century French lawyers
French opera librettists
19th-century French dramatists and playwrights
19th-century French novelists
Writers from Paris
1827 births
1909 deaths